The Coalition of Mexican Feminist Women (Coalición de Mujeres Feministas Mexicanas) was a Mexican feminist organization created in 1976.

History
The coalition brought together five existing Mexican feminist groups, and two publications, including the recently founded fem. It published its own periodical, Cihuat.

The group's priority was decriminalizing abortion in Mexico, articulating an ideal of 'voluntary motherhood' (maternidad voluntaria). At the Coalición's second National Conference on Abortion, in September 1977, members drafted a bill to decriminalize abortion, the 'Law of Voluntary Motherhood'. They presented the bill to the Chamber of Deputies (Mexico) in December 1977, demonstrating outside until they were allowed in for an audience with a legislator from the Institutional Revolutionary Party. The legislator did not sponsor the bill before Congress.

On Mother's Day in 1978 the coalition marched as mourning women ('mujeres elutadas'), carrying funeral wreaths in memory of women who had died after badly performed illegal abortions. 

From 1978 to 1980 the coalition started working with non-feminist women's groups, trying to build a broader coalition for abortion law reform. In 1981 it worked with the Mexican Communist Party to draft another bill to decriminalize abortion,. After this also failed to pass into law, the coalition lost momentum and dissolved.

References

Women's organizations based in Mexico
Organizations established in 1976
Feminist organizations in Mexico
1976 establishments in Mexico
Abortion-rights organizations
1980s disestablishments in Mexico
Organizations disestablished in the 1980s